Balad Air Base , is an Iraqi Air Force base located near Balad in the Sunni Triangle  north of Baghdad, Iraq.

Built in the early 1980s, it was originally named Al-Bakr Air Base. In 2003 the base was captured by the United States Armed Forces at the start of the Iraq War and was called both Balad Air Base and Anaconda Logistical Support Area (LSA) by the United States Army before being renamed Joint Base Balad on June 15, 2008. The base was handed back to the Iraqi Air Force on November 8, 2011, during the U.S. withdrawal from Iraq, after which it returned to being called Balad Air Base.

During the Iraq War it was the second largest U.S. base in Iraq. It was also one of the busiest airports in the world with 27,500 takeoffs and landings per month, second only to Heathrow Airport. Today it is home to the Iraqi Air Force's Lockheed Martin F-16 Fighting Falcon.

History

Iraqi use
Balad was formerly known as Al-Bakr Air Base, named in honor of Ahmed Hassan al-Bakr, the president of Iraq from 1968 to 1979. It was considered by many in the Iraqi military to be the most important airfield of the Iraqi Air Force. During most of the 1980s, it operated with at least a brigade level force, with two squadrons of Mikoyan-Gurevich MiG-23 fighters. Al-Bakr Air Base was especially well known for the large number of hardened aircraft shelters (HAS) built by Yugoslavian contractors during the Iran–Iraq War in the mid-1980s. It had four hardened areas—one each on either end of the main runways—with approximately 30 individual aircraft shelters.

U.S. military presence (2003–2011)

The base was captured by U.S. forces in early April 2003, renaming it Camp Anaconda and later Joint Base Balad. The area was nicknamed "Mortaritaville" (in a play on Margaritaville), because of a high frequency of incoming mortars, at times every day, from Iraqi insurgents.

The US Army's 310th Sustainment Command (Expeditionary) and the US Air Force's 332d Air Expeditionary Wing were headquartered at JBB. It was decided that the facility share one name, even though for many reasons and for its many occupants, it had differing names. Until mid-2008 the US Army had been in charge of Balad but, when it was re-designated as a joint base, the US Air Force assumed overall control. Balad was the central logistical hub for forces in Iraq. Camp Anaconda has also been more colloquially-termed "Life Support Area Anaconda"  or the "Big Snake".

It housed 28,000 military personnel and 8,000 civilian contractors. Like most large bases in Iraq, LSA Anaconda offered amenities, circa 2006 and later, including a base movie theater (Sustainer Theater), two Base/Post Exchanges (BX/PX), fast food courts including Subway, Popeyes, Pizza Hut, Taco Bell (2007), Burger King, Green Beans Coffee, a Turkish cafe, an Iraqi bazaar, multiple gyms, dance lessons, an Olympic size swimming pool, and an indoor swimming pool. The base was a common destination for celebrities and politicians visiting US troops serving in Iraq on USO Tours including the Charlie Daniels band (2005), Vince Vaughn (2005), Carrie Underwood (2006),
Wayne Newton, Toby Keith, Gary Sinise, Chris Isaak, Neal McCoy, Oliver North, and WWE.

Units

Ground forces
 855th Military Police Company (Desert Warriors), AZ ARNG, April–July 2003
 123rd Mobile Public Affairs Detachment, AZ ARNG, October 2008 – September 2009
 129th Combat Sustainment Support Battalion (101st Sustainment Brigade)
 372d Transportation Company (129th CSSB)
 172nd Corps Support Group 
 1st Battalion, 142th Aviation Maintenance Battalion (AVIM) (172nd CSG)
 213th Area Support Group (ASG) (316th ESC)
 13th Combat Sustainment Support Battalion (213th ASG)
 308th Civil Affairs Brigade (March–April 2004)
 142ND ECB (HEAVY) & 957 MRBC (NDANG) April 2003 – Feb 2004
 32nd Signal Battalion, 22nd Signal Brigade 2003 – March 2004
 100th Battalion, 442nd Infantry Regiment, Jan 2005 – Jan 2006
 50th Signal Battalion (Airborne), 35th Signal Brigade, Nov 2004 – Nov 2005
 63rd Expeditionary Signal Battalion (ESB) 35th Signal Brigade July 2007 – Oct 2008
 557th Maintenance Company Oct 2007 – Dec 2008
 602nd Maintenance Company Apr 2008 – Jun 2009
 A/51st Signal Battalion (Airborne) (along with an unknown MP platoon and 692nd Quartermaster Battalion {Water Purification}) took control in mid April 2003 from the 1st Battalion, 124th Infantry Regiment until V corps arrived around 1 May 2003
 532nd Expeditionary Security Forces Squadron
 411th Engineer Brigade between 2006 and 2007
 NMCB 28 and NMCB 4 – 2007
 Headquarters and Support Company, 463d Engineer Combat Battalion (Heavy) between 2004 and 2005
 452 Ordnance Company (PLS/MOADS) between 2004 and 2005
 77th Sustainment Brigade 2011
 13th Corps Support Command (COSCOM) between 2004 and 2005
 1st Sustainment Command (Expeditionary) between 2006 and 2007
 316th Sustainment Command (Expeditionary) between 2007 and 2008
 1st Sustainment Command (Expeditionary) between 2008 and 2009
 194th Engineer Brigade (TN ARNG), Jackson, TN; Corps Engineer Brigade, August 2009 – April 2010
 103rd Sustainment Command (Expeditionary) between 2009 and 2011
 100th Infantry Battalion
 834th Aviation Support Battalion
 864th Engineer Battalion (Combat Heavy)
 912th AG Company (Postal) 1st and 2nd PLT (Orlando, FL) June 2003 – June 2004
 29th Brigade Combat Team (Hawaii ARNG) January 2005 – February 2006
 323rd Military Police Company (Toledo, Ohio) April 2003 – July 2003
 Bravo Company, 279th Signal Battalion, Alabama ARNG, 2004–2005
 81st HBCT, WA ARNG, April 2004 – 2005
 30th Engineer Brigade (Theater Army) NC ARNG January–December 2005
  1563 flight Royal Air Force   2005–2011
  705th T.C. Fuel Tanker Company   2003–2004 – Army Reserve Unit based out of Dayton, Ohio
 1st Battalion 8th Infantry 3rd BCT 4th ID – 2003-2004 and 2005–2006 based out of Fort Carson, CO

Aviation forces
US Air Force
 332d Air Expeditionary Wing
 332d Expeditionary Operations Group
 22d Expeditionary Fighter Squadron – F-16CM Block 50 Fighting Falcons.
510th Expeditionary Fighter Squadron (Aviano AB, Italy)
 34th Expeditionary Fighter Squadron from May to October 2008
 332d Expeditionary Fighter Squadron – F-16 Block 30 Fighting Falcons
 107th Expeditionary Fighter Squadron (Michigan ANG)
 111th Expeditionary Fighter Squadron (Texas ANG)
 119th Expeditionary Fighter Squadron (New Jersey ANG)
 120th Expeditionary Fighter Squadron (Colorado ANG)
 121st Expeditionary Fighter Squadron (DC ANG)
 124th Expeditionary Fighter Squadron (Iowa ANG)
 125th Expeditionary Fighter Squadron (Oklaholma ANG)
 170th Expeditionary Fighter Squadron (Illinois ANG)
 176th Expeditionary Fighter Squadron (Wisconsin ANG)
 179th Expeditionary Fighter Squadron (Minnesota ANG)
 186th Expeditionary Fighter Squadron (Montana ANG)
 188th Expeditionary Fighter Squadron (New Mexico ANG)ANG)

 777th Expeditionary Airlift Squadron – C-130 Hercules
 64th Expeditionary Rescue Squadron – HH-60 Pave Hawk
 46th Expeditionary Reconnaissance Squadron – MQ-1B Predator
 332d Expeditionary Operations Support Squadron – airfield management
 362d Expeditionary Reconnaissance Squadron – MC-12W Liberty
 727th Expeditionary Air Control Squadron – tactical command and control agency
Army
 1st Battalion, 131st Aviation Regiment from September 2006.
 Task Force 11th Aviation Regiment (United States Army Europe) from April 2003 until February 2004
 528 Quartermasters Ft. Lewis Washington 2003–2004
 172 Medical Logistics Battalion, Ogden, UT 2003-2004
 M/158 Aviation Regiment (AVIM) (1-142 AVN BN)
 159th Combat Aviation Brigade Oct 2005 – Oct 2006

Structure
Starting in 2003, several mortar rounds and rockets were fired per day by insurgents, usually hitting the empty space between the runways, although there were isolated injuries and fatalities. By mid-2006, this rate had dropped by about 40%. Due to these attacks, the soldiers and airmen refer to the base as "Mortaritaville", though this name is shared with other bases in Iraq.

Joint Base Balad had a burn pit operation as late as the summer of 2010. The pit, which was visible for miles, was in continuous use which resulted in 147 tons of waste burnt per day, some of which was considered toxic. Respiratory difficulties and headaches were attributed to smoke inhalation from the burnt waste; however, according to research conducted on behalf of the US Department of Veteran Affairs, there is insufficient evidence to connect those symptoms to burn pits. Despite this, the VA allows service members to file claims for symptoms they believe to be related to burn pit exposure.

Joint base Balad was also home to the Air Force Theater Hospital, a Level I trauma center which boasted a 98% survival rate for wounded Americans and Iraqis alike.

A black jail, a U.S. military detention camp to interrogate high-value detainees, was established at Balad in summer 2004, named the Temporary Screening Facility (TSF). A British Secret Intelligence Service (MI6) lawyer who visited a black jail, believed to be at Balad, described it as holding prisoners in wooden crates, too small to stand in or lie down, who were subject to white noise. General Stanley McChrystal, commander of Joint Special Operations Command, regularly visited the site, reporting that the staff of interrogators and analysts was six times the number of detainees, enabling important detainees to be questioned through each shift.

Return to Iraqi control

On 8 November 2011, as U.S. forces were in the process of withdrawing from Iraq, Joint Base Balad was handed back to the Iraqi Air Force, after which it returned to being called Balad Air Base.

Sallyport Global 
In 2014, Sallyport Global, subsidiary of Caliburn International, was awarded contracts to work on Balad Air Base in support of the Iraq F-16 program. Following reports alleging timesheet fraud, investigators found evidence of alcohol smuggling, human trafficking, security violations, and theft. The investigators were subsequently fired by the human resources personnel that they were originally sent to investigate, and removed from the base under armed guard. Employees have also raised concern about racism, particularly from white South African security guards who made open endorsements of Apartheid and refused to work alongside Iraqis and other people of color. Former employees say that they feared for their safety at the base due to security failures. In one such report, a militia member shot a bomb-sniffing dog that had flagged their vehicle. It is also said that animals were intentionally starved, and the company withheld passports from employees who wished to leave.

Sallyport is also being investigated by United States Department of Justice on allegations of bribing Iraqi officials for exclusive contracts.

Current use

The base is home to the Iraqi Air Force's General Dynamics F-16 Fighting Falcons of 9th Fighter Squadron (21 aircraft delivered by November 2017).

The base came under attack by ISIL militants in late June 2014, when the insurgents launched mortar attacks and reportedly surrounded the base on three sides.

On January 4, 2020, the base came under a rocket attack, and no claims of responsibility have been made yet. The attack wounded four people. On 20 February 2021, four rockets targeted the base, in which one Iraqi contractor was wounded.

Rockets fell in Iraq’s Balad air base on March 17, 2022 leaving no damage, 2 security forces wounded.

See also
2007 Balad aircraft crash
List of United States Military installations in Iraq
United States Forces – Iraq

References

External links

Balad from GlobalSecurity.org
310th Expeditionary Sustainment Command' website
Iraq, Contingency Contracting and the Defense Base Act
Expeditionary Times
Anaconda Times

Installations of the United States Air Force in Iraq
Iraqi Air Force bases
Balad, Iraq
1980s establishments in Iraq